High School is a three-part BBC reality TV series that centers on a year in the life at Holyrood Secondary School in Glasgow, Scotland.

Synopsis
High School is filmed at Holyrood Secondary, a Catholic school and one of the largest comprehensive High Schools in Europe with over 2000 pupils. The series seeks to capture the school's ethos rather than the day-to-day minutiae, resulting in little in-class footage but highlighting crucial parts of the school year.  The film is narrated by actor Alec Newman, who plays the headmaster in Waterloo Road.

References

External links
BBC site
Friel Kean Films

BBC Scotland television shows
BBC television documentaries
Education in Glasgow
Catholic education
2010s British reality television series
English-language television shows